Giovan Battista della Cerva (c. 1515–1580) was an Italian painter.

Born in Novara, he was a pupil of Gaudenzio Ferrari, of whom he became the main assistant and collaborator during the last stage of his career. Works entirely by della Cerva include a Polyptych in Santa Maria di Piazza at Busto Arsizio, two altarpieces in San Nazario in Brolo at Milan and the frescoes (together with Bernardino Lanino) in the St. Catherine chapel near the latter.

He was also the master of Giovan Paolo Lomazzo. Giovan Battista della Cerva died in Milan in 1580.

References

1510s births
1580 deaths
16th-century Italian painters
Italian male painters
Painters from Milan
People from Novara